Dousti may refer to:

Dousti Square in Dushanbe, Tajikistan
Esmaeil Dousti (born  1958), Iranian politician
Nasrin Dousti (born 1988), Iranian karateka